A criminal lawyer is a lawyer specializing in the defense of individuals and companies charged with criminal conduct.

Criminal lawyer may also refer to:
Jailhouse lawyer, a criminal who gives legal advice to other criminals while incarcerated
Prosecutor, in a criminal trial
Criminal Lawyer (1937 film), a 1937 American drama film directed by Christy Cabanne
Criminal Lawyer (1951 film), a 1951 film starring Pat O'Brien